The Canton of Gentioux-Pigerolles is a former canton situated in the Creuse département and in the Limousin region of central France. It was disbanded following the French canton reorganisation which came into effect in March 2015. It consisted of seven communes, which joined the canton of Felletin in 2015. It had 1,458 inhabitants (2012).

Geography 
An area of farming, forestry and quarrying, with the town of Gentioux-Pigerolles, in the arrondissement of Aubusson, at its centre. The altitude varies from 525m (Faux-la-Montagne) to 929m (Gentioux-Pigerolles)  with an average altitude of 751m.

The canton comprised 7 communes:
Faux-la-Montagne
Féniers
Gentioux-Pigerolles
Gioux
La Nouaille
Saint-Marc-à-Loubaud
La Villedieu

Population

See also 
 Arrondissements of the Creuse department
 Cantons of the Creuse department
 Communes of the Creuse department

References

Gentioux-Pigerolles
2015 disestablishments in France
States and territories disestablished in 2015